Georgios Valerianos (born 13 February 1992) is a Greek professional footballer who plays as a left-back for Super League club Ionikos.

Club career
Valerianos began playing football with Olympiacos. He is a very talented player and one of the best young players who were playing in Olympiacos U-21. He made 44 appearances for the youth team with four goals. Valerianos was first included in Olympiacos' first team in a league match against Panthrakikos on 11 April 2010, where he appeared as a second-half substitute. On 22 July 2014 he signed for Iraklis in the Greek Football League. Valerianos debuted for Iraklis in a cup match against Lamia. 
On 12 August 2015, he signed a contract with second-tier club Apollon Smyrnis. On 29 January 2016, he solved his contract with the club.

The 27-year-old left back can be considered as somewhat of a journeyman despite his age as in July 2017, signed with Aris that officially announced his acquisition. His path to the top has been chequered and he has had to do it the hard way, meaning a lot of resilience was needed. Even this season at Aris, he has been a squad player that has been rotated in and out of the team.

On 1 July 2019, after two years with Aris, Valerianos signed a three years' contract with Cypriot club Pafos for an undisclosed fee. On 4 July 2019, the international back will have an intermediary station in his career after being loaned to Riga, a Latvian football club, which owns the same property status as Pafos. According to sources the borrowing will take just a month for the international left back in order to help the club for the 2019–20 UEFA Europa League qualifying phase and play-off round.

On 25 June 2021, Valerianos returned to Greece, signing a two-year contract with Ionikos.

International career
On 19 March 2019, Greece head coach Angelos Anastasiadis announced the first call up of Valerianos for the match against Liechtenstein and Bosnia and Herzegovina for UEFA Euro 2020. He made his debut on 30 May 2019, in a friendly against Turkey, as a starter.

Career statistics

Club

Honours
Riga
 Latvian Higher League: 2019

Olympiacos
 Greek Cup: 2011–12

References

External links
Profile at Sport.gr
 

1992 births
Living people
Greek expatriate footballers
Greece youth international footballers
Greece international footballers
Super League Greece players
Football League (Greece) players
Cypriot First Division players
Latvian Higher League players
Olympiacos F.C. players
Thrasyvoulos F.C. players
A.O. Glyfada players
OFI Crete F.C. players
Kavala F.C. players
Iraklis Thessaloniki F.C. players
Apollon Smyrnis F.C. players
Platanias F.C. players
Aris Thessaloniki F.C. players
Footballers from Athens
Greek footballers
Association football defenders
Riga FC players
Pafos FC players
Ionikos F.C. players
Expatriate footballers in Latvia
Greek expatriate sportspeople in Latvia
Expatriate footballers in Cyprus
Greek expatriate sportspeople in Cyprus